Shirley Frances Babashoff (born January 31, 1957) is an American former competition swimmer, Olympic champion, and former world record-holder in multiple events.  Babashoff set six world records and earned a total of nine Olympic medals in her career. She won a gold medal in the 400-meter freestyle relay in both the 1972 and 1976 Olympics, and she won the 1975 world championship in both the 200-meter and 400-meter freestyle.

During her career, she set 37 national records (17 individual and 20 relay) and for some time held all national freestyle records from the 100-meter to 800-meter event.

1976 Summer Olympics
At the 1976 U.S. Olympic Trials, she won all the freestyle events, as well as the 400-meter individual medley, setting one world and six national records in the process.

At the 1976 Summer Olympics in Montreal, Quebec, she won four silver medals and a gold medal in the 4×100-meter freestyle relay in world record time, despite the competition being dominated by the East German swimmers.  The four silver medals came in the 200-meter, 400-meter and 800-meter freestyle, and the 4×100-meter medley relay.  Although Babashoff never won an individual gold medal in Olympic competition, she is still regarded as one of the top swimmers in history, and is most vividly remembered for having swum the anchor leg on the gold-medal winning 4×100-meter freestyle relay team, in its victory over the doped up, steroid-plagued 1976 East German women, in what is widely acknowledged as having been the single greatest race in the entire history of women's swimming. The East German team of Kornelia Ender, Petra Thumer, Andrea Pollack and Claudia Hempel was heavily favored to win the race. Prior to the relay, American sportscaster Donna de Varona picked East Germany to win the event, but Kim Peyton, Wendy Boglioli and Jill Sterkel teamed with Babashoff to pull off a great upset as Babashoff outlegged Hempel down the stretch to win the gold medal and shatter the world record by 4 seconds.  After the event, de Varona said, "I have never been happier to eat my words in the prediction I made right before this event."  Shirley Babashoff's time in winning the silver medal in the 400-meter freestyle at the 1976 Olympics would have defeated men's gold medalist Don Schollander twelve years earlier at the 1964 Olympics in Tokyo.

Personal life

Babashoff was one of four children of Jack Babashoff, a machinist, and Vera Slivkoff, a housewife.  Her father had been a swimming instructor in Hawaii and always wanted his own children to become Olympians. Both of her parents are second-generation Russian American.

In 1982, she was inducted in the International Swimming Hall of Fame as an "Honor Swimmer."

Babashoff was occasionally referred to as "Surly Shirley" and described as a "sore loser" by the media because of her public accusations of drug cheating by the East German swimmers. To her credit, she was later proven correct-that most East German athletes were using performance-enhancing drugs, substantiated by investigators in the PBS documentary, "Secrets of the Dead: Doping for Gold."  
Shirley's accusations of drug use by East German swimmers was widely confirmed after the fall of Communism in East Germany. It is estimated that the Shirley was denied three gold medals as a result of cheating by East Germany.

After her Olympic career ended, Babashoff coached swimming, had a son in 1986 whom she raised alone, and became a letter carrier for the United States Postal Service in Orange County, California.

On April 30, 2005, Babashoff received the Olympic Order, the highest award of the Olympic Movement, during the Inaugural Olympic Assembly luncheon. International Olympic Committee members Bob Ctvrtlik, Anita DeFrantz, and Jim Easton presented the award. The IOC established the Olympic Order in 1974 to honor individuals who have illustrated the Olympic Ideals through their actions, have achieved remarkable merit in the sporting world, or have rendered outstanding services to the Olympic cause, either through their own personal achievements or their contributions to the development of sport.

Her brother Jack Babashoff won the silver medal behind teammate Jim Montgomery in the 100-meter freestyle at the 1976 Olympics.  Her other brother Bill and sister Debbie were also swimmers who competed internationally. Shirley attended Fountain Valley High School in Fountain Valley, California. In 1973 she led the school to their first-ever California Interscholastic Federation Championship in girls' swimming.

See also

 List of multiple Olympic medalists at a single Games
 List of multiple Summer Olympic medalists
 List of Olympic medalists in swimming (women)
 List of University of California, Los Angeles people
 List of World Aquatics Championships medalists in swimming (women)
 World record progression 200 metres freestyle
 World record progression 400 metres freestyle
 World record progression 800 metres freestyle
 World record progression 4 × 100 metres freestyle relay

References

Bibliography 

 De George, Matthew, Pooling Talent: Swimming's Greatest Teams, Rowman & Littlefield, Lanham, Maryland (2014).  .

Further reading

External links

 
 
 
 
 Babashoff had mettle to speak out about steroids by Christine Brennan
 Bleacher Report on Shirley Babashoff
 
 Babashoff And Ender by Sports Illustrated on July 13, 1992

|-

|-

1957 births
Living people
American female freestyle swimmers
American people of Russian descent
World record setters in swimming
Olympic gold medalists for the United States in swimming
Olympic silver medalists for the United States in swimming
Sportspeople from Whittier, California
Swimmers at the 1972 Summer Olympics
Swimmers at the 1976 Summer Olympics
University of California, Los Angeles alumni
World Aquatics Championships medalists in swimming
Medalists at the 1976 Summer Olympics
Medalists at the 1972 Summer Olympics
21st-century American women